Kyun! Ho Gaya Na..., released in English as Look What's Happened Now, is a 2004 Indian Hindi-language romance film directed by Samir Karnik starring Vivek Oberoi and Aishwarya Rai in lead roles. This Bollywood film was the acting  debut of Kajal Aggarwal. Upon release, it performed average business at the box office.

Plot 
Diya (Aishwarya Rai) is an intelligent university student with strong views on love and marriage. She spends much of her time at an orphanage in Coorg, helping her "Uncle" Raj Chauhan (Amitabh Bachchan) with the children living there. The story begins when Diya travels to Mumbai for her written exams. While there, she stays with her father's friend and meets their lighthearted, free-spirited son, Arjun (Vivek Oberoi). His views on love and life are completely different from hers. The pair start spending an increasing amount of time with each other and throughout all their arguments and conversations, they soon fall in love. Diya is more open about professing her feelings, while Arjun is an introvert, being reluctant and prefers not to disclose his true intentions. Diya is left feeling heartbroken after he denies loving her, and she leaves him.

Arjun travels to the orphanage, in the hopes of reconciling with Diya and apologising to her. There, he realizes his true feelings for Diya and is eager to reveal his love for her. It is revealed that Diya is now planning to marry her childhood friend, Ishaan (Suniel Shetty). Diya and Arjun start spending more time together and once again rekindle their romance. It is later revealed that Ishaan is only just a friend of Diya's and the fake marriage was a plan made up by Raj to teach Arjun the importance of always being true to love and following his heart. She then marries Arjun.

Cast 
 Amitabh Bachchan as Raj Chauhan, Diya's uncle
 Aishwarya Rai as Diya Malhotra Khanna
 Vivek Oberoi as Arjun Khanna
 Suniel Shetty as Ishaan
 Gaurav Gera as Vinay
 Ajit Ahuja as Manu
 Diya Mirza as Preeti
 Om Puri as Mr. Khanna
 Rati Agnihotri as Sulochana Khanna
 Tinnu Anand as Malhotra
 Rahul Singh as Banna/Ranveer Singh (credited as Raahul Singh)
 Kajal Aggarwal as Diya's sister (cameo role)
 Jennifer Winget as Diya's friend
 Sheena Bajaj

Production 
Kyun! Ho Gaya Na... marked the acting debut of Kajal Aggarwal.

Soundtrack

References

External links 
 

2004 films
2000s Hindi-language films
Indian romantic comedy films
Films scored by Shankar–Ehsaan–Loy
2004 directorial debut films
Films directed by Samir Karnik
2004 romantic comedy films